"Better Days" is a song by Indigenous Australian musicians Baker Boy, Dallas Woods, and Zambian-born Australian rapper Sampa the Great. It was released on 23 September 2020.

Background
"Better Days" follows his March single "Move", and is Baker's second single release for 2020. The song is the second collaboration Baker and Woods have released (after Woods featured on 2018's "Black Magic"), but is the first time either Baker or Woods have collaborated with Sampa the Great.

The track was premiered on Triple J's Drive with Hobba and Hing on 22 September 2020.

Composition and lyrics
Musically, "Better Days" is a hip hop, and neo soul song. The song contains lyrics in three languages: English, Yolngu Matha and Bemba.

The lyrics discuss "oppression, the pressures of meeting the expectations of your culture, and imposter syndrome ."

Promotion
Baker began teasing the collaboration on Instagram on 16 September, sharing a photo of the three artists together. The following day, he confirmed the artists had worked together, announcing the single on social media. Baker additionally posted videos of himself on TikTok, showing him dancing amongst various Bendigo landmarks.

Critical reception
Triple J's Sose Fuamoli felt that the song "shows a new side of the artist's musicality and proves that he can explore honest territory with emotional depth.

Beat Magazines Kate Streader thought the song was "new thematic territory" for Baker and felt the song offered "an ultimately uplifting message of resilience and perseverance".

Stack Magazines Amy Flower described the song as "piping hot" and called its release "timely".

Track listings

In popular culture
 On 21 September 2020, two days prior to the song's release, the song's Airwolf remix was used to soundtrack TikTok's first local campaign in Australia.

Credits and personnel
Credits adapted from Spotify.

Performing artists
 Baker Boy – vocals
 Dallas Woods – vocals
 Sampa the Great – vocals
 Airwolf – production 

Additional personnel
 Dallas Woods – writing
 Danny Duque Perez – writing
 Danzal Baker – writing
 Dennis Dowlut – writing
 Kasey Heerah – writing
 Maxwell Bidstrup – writing
 Mike Scala – writing
 Sampa Tembo – writing
 Dennis Dowlut – production
 Maxwell Bidstrup – production

References

2020 singles
2020 songs
Baker Boy songs
Dallas Woods songs
Sampa the Great songs
Songs written by Baker Boy
Songs written by Dallas Woods
Songs written by Sampa the Great